Hypsopsetta is a genus of righteye flounders native to the Pacific coast of California and the Baja California peninsula, as well as the Gulf of California.

Species
There are currently two recognized species in this genus:
 Hypsopsetta guttulata (Girard, 1856) (Diamond turbot)
 Hypsopsetta macrocephala Breder, 1936

References 

 
Pleuronectidae
Marine fish genera
Taxa named by Theodore Gill